Qaleh Biyaban (also Romanized as Qal’eh Bīyābān, Qal‘eh Bīābān, and Qal‘eh-ye Beyābān; also known as Ghal‘eh Biyabān and Qal‘eh-ye Bīābānī) is a village in Qaleh Biyaban Rural District, in the Central District of Darab County, Fars Province, Iran. At the 2006 census, its population was 1,198, in 243 families.

References 

Populated places in Darab County